Laura Freixas (born 1958) is a Spanish novelist, short story writer, and newspaper columnist.

Biography

Freixas was born in Barcelona in 1958. Laura Freixas is the granddaughter of Freixas Miquel. Freixas studied at the French School in her home city of Barcelona. She got a BA degree in Law in 1980 from the University of Barcelona. She has been active as a writer since 1988. Freixas' work also includes scholarship and promotion of women writers.

She has also worked in international universities as a publisher, a Spanish language assistant, and a translator. At present she teaches literature workshops for different institutions. She writes as a columnist for the newspaper La Vanguardia and does literary reviews for its supplement Cultura/s. She is a contributor to literary magazines such as Mercurio, Letras libres, El País, and Revista de Libros.

She has been a lecturer or a writer in residence at many Spanish and foreign universities and taught creative writing at the University of Virginia (UVA). She is a member of the European Cultural Parliament and the chair of the association Clásicas y Modernas for gender equality in Spanish culture from 2009 to 2017.

Freixas has campaigned against trans-inclusive laws in Spain as she views it as a regression for Spanish gender equality.

Literary Work

Novels
 The Last Sunday in London (1997)
 Just Between Friends (1998)
 Love or Whatever It Is (2005)

Short story collections
 The Wrist Murderer (1988)
 Tales at the Age of Forty (2001)

Compilations 

 Mothers and Daughters (1996) – Freixas also wrote the prologue
 Women Friends (2009)

Non-fiction works
 Women and Literature (2000)
La novela femenil y sus lectrices (2009)

Autobiography
 A Teenager in Barcelona Around 1970 (2007)

References

External links

  Freixas' official site is available in Spanish and English
 Laura Freixas's documentary and interview in Tesis program  Archived
 Official Site of Association Clásicas y Modernas for gender equality in Spanish culture 

1958 births
Living people
Novelists from Catalonia
People from Barcelona
Spanish literary critics
Spanish women literary critics
Women writers from Catalonia
Spanish women novelists
Spanish women short story writers
Spanish short story writers
Spanish columnists
Spanish women columnists
20th-century Spanish novelists
20th-century Spanish women writers
20th-century short story writers